Rožengrunt is a dispersed settlement in the Municipality of Sveta Ana in the Slovene Hills in northeastern Slovenia.

There is a large chapel in the settlement. It is dedicated to The Visitation of the Virgin Mary. It has a sanctuary with a two-storey belfry and dates to the early 20th century.

References

External links
Rožengrunt on Geopedia

Populated places in the Municipality of Sveta Ana